Hoseynabad (also Romanized as Ḩoseynābād; also known as Husainābād and Hussinabad) is a village in Pol-e Doab Rural District, Zalian District, Shazand County, Markazi Province, Iran. At the 2006 census, its population was 93, in 29 families.

References 

Populated places in Shazand County